Antonín Bartoň (December 12, 1908 in Vysoké nad Jizerou, Bohemia – September 9, 1982) was a Czechoslovakian Nordic skier who competed in the 1930s. He won two silver medals at the 1933 FIS Nordic World Ski Championships in Innsbruck (Nordic combined and 4 x 10 km).

Bartoň finished 6th in the Nordic combined event at the 1932 Winter Olympics in Lake Placid, New York. He finished also 16th in the shorter cross-country skiing event, 10th in the 50 kilometre event and 21st in the ski jumping competition.

External links

World Championship results 

1908 births
1982 deaths
People from Vysoké nad Jizerou
Czech male cross-country skiers
Czech male Nordic combined skiers
Czechoslovak male cross-country skiers
Czechoslovak male Nordic combined skiers
Olympic cross-country skiers of Czechoslovakia
Olympic Nordic combined skiers of Czechoslovakia
Olympic ski jumpers of Czechoslovakia
Cross-country skiers at the 1932 Winter Olympics
Nordic combined skiers at the 1932 Winter Olympics
Ski jumpers at the 1932 Winter Olympics
FIS Nordic World Ski Championships medalists in cross-country skiing
FIS Nordic World Ski Championships medalists in Nordic combined
Sportspeople from the Liberec Region